Masopust (feminine Masopustová) is a Czech surname (meaning carnival), it may refer to:
 Masopust, the Slavic carnival
 Josef Masopust (1931–2015), Czech footballer
 Karel Masopust (1942–2019), Czech ice hockey player
 Lukáš Masopust (born 1993), Czech footballer
 Miloslav Masopust, Czech general

Czech-language surnames